Hyner is an unincorporated community in Clinton County, Pennsylvania, United States.

Fossil discoveries
Fossils of extinct species have been found in the Catskill Formation of the Red Hill Shale, dating to the upper Devonian (365 to 363 million years ago); these species incorporate "Hyner" in their genus names: Hyneria, a predatory lobe-finned fish, and Hynerpeton, an early four-limbed vertebrate that lived in the rivers and ponds.

References

Unincorporated communities in Clinton County, Pennsylvania
Unincorporated communities in Pennsylvania